Qaryat Umar al Mukhtar  is a village in the District of Jabal al Akhdar in north-eastern Libya. It was named after the Libyan resistance leader Omar Mukhtar. Under the Italian rule it was known as Mameli after the Italian patriot Goffredo Mameli.

It is located 22 km south of Bayda.

References

External links

Populated places in Jabal al Akhdar